As of 2015, the Chinese language had two translations available of the Tirukkural.

History of translations
The first Chinese translation of the Kural text was made by Che'ng Hsi in 1967, published by the Department of Indian Studies, University of Malaya and printed at the Hong Kong University Press. The Nattukottai Chettiars Endowment Fund, which has also provided a Malay translation, funded the first Chinese translation. The second translation was made by Yu Hsi in 2014, which is a complete translation made in Mandarin.

Translations

Similarities with Confucian thoughts
The Kural text (called Tirukkural, meaning "Sacred Verses") and the Confucian sayings recorded in the classic Analects of Chinese (called Lun Yu, meaning "Sacred Sayings") resemble each other in many ways. Both Valluvar and Confucius focused on the behaviors and moral conducts of a common person. Similar to Valluvar, Confucius advocated legal justice embracing human principles, courtesy, and filial piety, besides the virtues of benevolence, righteousness, loyalty and trustworthiness as foundations of life. Incidentally, Valluvar differed from Confucius in two respects. Firstly, unlike Confucius, Valluvar was also a poet. Secondly, Confucius did not deal with the subject of conjugal love, for which Valluvar devoted an entire division in his work.

See also
 Tirukkural translations
 List of Tirukkural translations by language

References 

Chinese
Translations into Chinese